Janatas (Zhaŋatas) is a town in Sarysu District of Jambyl Region of southern Kazakhstan. The name means "New stone" in Kazakh, referring to the newly found phosphorite deposits. Janatas serves as the administrative center of the district. Population:

Geography
The town lies north of the Karatau slopes, by the banks of the Burkittі (Бүркітті) river, a left tributary of the Shabakty.

History
Janatas was founded in 1964 as a settlement to serve the phosphorite deposits. In 1969, it was granted town status.

The town was steadily growing until the 1990s, when most industrial enterprises closed down owing to economic hardships, and population started to decline. As of 2013, some of residential areas stand deserted.

Economy

Industry
As of 2013, the only functioning industrial enterprise in the town is the phosphorite factory.

Transportation
Janatas is connected by railway with Taraz. There is no passenger service.

There is road access to E40 and further to Taraz and Shymkent.

References

Populated places in Jambyl Region